The Koldam Hydropower Station commonly known as Koldam, is an embankment dam on the Sutlej River upstream of the Dehar Power House. It is 18 km from Bilaspur off the Chandigarh-Manali Highway (NH-21) near Barmana, Himachal Pradesh, India. The main purpose of the dam is hydroelectric power generation and it will support an 800 MW power station. The dam was constructed by NTPC Limited (erstwhile  National Thermal Power Corporation Limited).

Koldam project was first conceived in mid‐sixties and investigations on various possible sites had been in progress since 1966. Based on investigation carried out until 1975, a project report was prepared which envisaged construction of rockfill dam having an installed capacity of 600 MW. The work of investigation and studies was taken by HPSEB in October, 1984. The project capacity was revised to 800 MW, but work did not start for lack of funds. Subsequently, Koldam Hydro Project was taken over by NTPC in 2000 and Project Report was revised with a 167m high rock fill dam and Surface Power House located at toe of the dam with installed capacity of 4X200 MW.

The foundation stone for the dam was laid on 5 June 2000 by Prime Minister Atal Bihari Vajpayee. On 14 January 2004, main construction on the dam began. KB Dubey was the first Head of the Project (BUH) . The current BUH is NS Thakur (since 2020).

Due to problems associated with geological issues and declaration of part of reservoir area in 2006 as extension of Majathal Wildlife Sanctuary, the project got delayed. Attempts to impound the reservoir first failed in December 2013 due to problems with sealing the diversion tunnels. By 18 March 2014, a fourth attempt to seal the tunnels and fill the lake was underway. Repairs were made and another unsuccessful impounding was reached in April 2014 as the diversion tunnel continued to leak. Another period of impounding began on 3 November 2014 and finished on 3 January 2015. A tunnel still leaked though but authorities were confident they would have the power station operational by April. Generator commissioning was originally scheduled for 2009 but was rescheduled to 2015.

Construction 
The contract of construction of dam was awarded to Thailand's ITD Public Company Limited. A joint venture company of BHEL, Toshiba and Marubeni supplied turbines and generators.

Power Generation Capacity 
Its installed capacity is of 800 MW (4x200 MW).  The first 200 MW Francis turbine-generator was commissioned on 30 March 2015 and the third on 10 April 2015.

See also 

Bhakra Dam – located downstream
Pandoh Dam

References

Dams in Himachal Pradesh
Hydroelectric power stations in Himachal Pradesh
Rock-filled dams
Dams on the Sutlej River
Dams completed in 2015
Energy infrastructure completed in 2015
2015 establishments in Himachal Pradesh
Buildings and structures in Mandi district